The Goliath birdeater (Theraphosa blondi) belongs to the tarantula family Theraphosidae. Found in northern South America, it is the largest spider in the world by mass and body length (up to ), and second to the giant huntsman spider by leg span. It is also called the Goliath tarantula or Goliath bird-eating spider; the practice of calling theraphosids "bird-eating" derives from an early 18th-century copper engraving by Maria Sibylla Merian that shows one eating a hummingbird. Despite the spider's name, it rarely preys on birds.

Physical description 

Birdeaters are one of the few tarantula species that lack tibial spurs, located on the first pair of legs of most adult males. They are mostly tan to light brown and golden-hued.

Lifecycle 
Unlike other species of spider/tarantula, females do not eat the males during mating. Females mature in 3–6 years and have an average lifespan of 15 to 25 years. Males die soon after maturity and have a lifespan of three to six years. Colors range from dark to light brown with faint markings on the legs. Bird-eaters have hair on their bodies, abdomens, and legs. The female lays 100 to 200 eggs, which hatch into spiderlings within 6–8 weeks.

Behaviour

Defenses 
In response to threats, Goliath birdeaters stridulate by rubbing setae on their pedipalps and legs. Also, when threatened they rub their abdomen with their hind legs and release hairs that are a severe irritant to the skin and mucous membranes. These urticating hairs can be harmful to humans.

Like all tarantulas, T. blondi spiders have fangs large enough to break the skin of a human. They carry venom in their fangs and have been known to bite when threatened, but the venom is relatively harmless and its effects are comparable to those of a wasp's sting. Tarantulas generally bite humans only in self-defence, and these bites do not always result in envenomation (known as a "dry bite”).

Feeding 
Despite its name,  the Goliath birdeater only rarely actually preys on birds; in the wild, its diet consists primarily of other large arthropods, worms, and amphibians. However, because of its size and opportunistic predatory behavior,  this species commonly kills and consumes a variety of insects and small terrestrial vertebrates. They do not consume their prey in the open; rather, they drag it back to their burrow and begin the digesting process. They do this by liquifying the insides of their prey and proceed to suck it dry. In the wild, T. blondi has been observed feeding on rodents, frogs, toads, lizards, and even snakes.

Distribution and habitat 
The Goliath birdeater is native to the upland rain forest regions of Northern South America: Suriname, Guyana, French Guiana, northern Brazil, and southern Venezuela. Most noticeable in the Amazon rainforest, the spider is terrestrial, living in deep burrows, and is found commonly in marshy or swampy areas. It is a nocturnal species.

Culinary use 
The Goliath birdeater is an edible spider. The spider is part of the local cuisine in northeastern South America, prepared by singeing off the urticating hairs and roasting it in banana leaves. The flavor has been described as "shrimp-like".

See also
 Giant huntsman spider, largest known spider in the world by leg span
 Mongolarachne jurassica, the largest known fossilised spider
 Cerbalus aravaensis, a huntsman spider found in Israel and Jordan

References

External links 

 Biggest Spiders in The World
 
 Video of the Goliath birdeater at National Geographic
 Video of the Goliath birdeater being hunted by children

Theraphosidae
Spiders of South America
Invertebrates of Brazil
Fauna of French Guiana
Invertebrates of Guyana
Fauna of Suriname
Invertebrates of Venezuela
Fauna of the Amazon
Edible spiders